Zarephath Wines is an Australian winery based at East Porongurup, in the Great Southern wine region of Western Australia. The winery was founded in 1994 by a small Benedictine religious community, The Christ Circle.  It was sold in 2013 to new owners Rosie Singer and Ian Barrett-Lennard. Zarephath Cafe opened at Easter 2015 serving local and seasonal produce Friday to Sunday. Zarephath continues to produce award-winning wine including pinot noir, chardonnay and riesling.

See also

 Australian wine
 List of wineries in Western Australia
 Western Australian wine
 Zarephath, New Jersey

References

Notes

Bibliography

External links
Zarephath Wines – official site

Australian companies established in 1994
Great Southern (Western Australia)
Wineries in Western Australia